Lycée Descartes or Lycée français René-Descartes (LFRD) may refer to:

Schools in France:
 Lycée Descartes de Montigny le Bretonneux in Montigny le Bretonneux, Yvelines, Paris metropolitan area
 Lycée Descartes (Antony) in Antony, Hauts-de-Seine
  in Tours, Indre-et-Loire
 Lycée Descartes (Champs-sur-Marne) in Champs-sur-Marne, Seine-et-Marne, Paris metropolitan area
 Lycée Descartes (Clermont-Ferrand) in Clermont-Ferrand

French international schools outside France:
 Lycée Descartes (Rabat) in Rabat, Morocco
 Lycée français René-Descartes de Kinshasa - Democratic Republic of the Congo
 Lycée français René-Descartes de Phnom Penh - Cambodia

Bilingual schools outside France:
 Lycée Cheikh Bouamama, formerly Lycée Descartes, in Algiers, Algeria